Pogue is the surname name of:

 Alan Pogue (born 1946), American photojournalist
 Charles Edward Pogue American film and television writer
 Charles Nelson Pogue (1897–1985), inventor of a miracle carburettor for petrol engines
 David Pogue (born 1963), Yahoo! Finance columnist, formerly New York Times 
 Donald C. Pogue (1947-2016), American judge
 Forrest Pogue (1912–1996), US Army historian
 Harold Pogue (1893–1969), American football player and businessman
 Jamie Pogue (born 1977), Canadian baseball coach
 Justyn Pogue, American musician
 Ken Pogue (born 1934), Canadian actor
 L. Welch Pogue (1899–2003), American aviation attorney
 William R. Pogue (1930–2014), American astronaut

See also  
The Pogues (band), a band of mixed Irish and English background
H & S Pogue, American department store in Ohio  
Pogue's Run, creek in Indiana named after George Pogue 
Battle of Pogue's Run, American Civil War incident or "battle" in 1863 
Pogue, a derogatory term.

Surnames